Aerobic gymnastics at the 2007 Asian Indoor Games was held in Workers Sports Pavilion, Macau, China from 26 October to 28 October 2007.

Medalists

Medal table

Results

Men's individual

Qualification round
27 October

Final
28 October

Women's individual

Qualification round
26 October

Final
28 October

Mixed pair

Qualification round
26 October

Final
28 October

Trio

Qualification round
27 October

Final
28 October

References
 Official Results

External links
 2007 Asian Indoor Games official website

2007 Asian Indoor Games events
2007 in gymnastics
Aerobic Gymnastics,2007